Kjersti Døvigen (27 June 1943 – 26 January 2021) was a Norwegian actress. She was known, among other things, for her role in the popular Norwegian TV-drama Offshore.

At the age of seven, Kjersti started dancing, her career began as a ballet dancer. She worked in this area at the Norwegian Opera for eight years before her breakthrough in 1967 in Claudine's role in CanCan.

Døvigen, the widow of financier Halvor Astrup, was the mother of the actress Ulrikke Hansen Døvigen and lived in Bath, England.

Selected filmography
 1963: Elskere as Guro
 1969: Psychedelica Blues as Lissy
 1970: Douglas as Kari
 1974: The Last Fleksnes as Unni
 1976: Lasse & Geir as Kjersti
 1976: Bør Børson II as Ida Olsen
 1980: Life and Death as Jennifer

References

External links

1943 births
2021 deaths
Norwegian film actresses
Norwegian television actresses
20th-century Norwegian actresses
21st-century Norwegian actresses